Prendeignes is a commune in the Lot department in south-western France.

See also
Communes of the Lot department

References

Communes of Lot (department)